Scombrops boops, the gnomefish,   is a species of marine ray-finned fish, a gnomefish from the family Scombropidae. It is found in the Indo-West Pacific and marginally in the south eastern Atlantic. It occurs off South Africa and Mozambique and around Japan and in the South China Sea. Adults inhabit deep rocky waters while the juveniles are found in shallower areas. It feeds on crustaceans, cephalopods and other fishes.

References

Scombropidae
Fish described in 1782